The Black Reel Awards, or BRAs, is an annual American awards ceremony hosted by the Foundation for the Augmentation of African-Americans in Film (FAAAF) to recognize excellence of African Americans, as well as the cinematic achievements of the African diaspora, in the global film industry, as assessed by the foundation’s voting membership. The various category winners are awarded a copy of a statuette, officially called the Black Reel Award. The awards, first presented in 2000 in Washington, DC, are overseen by FAAAF.

The awards ceremony was initially awarded online during its first two years before the first live show presentation in 2002. The awards have broadcast to radio since 2014. The Black Reel Awards is the oldest cinema-exclusive awards ceremony for African Americans.

History
Founded by film critic Tim Gordon and Sabrina McNeal in 2000, the first annual Black Reel Awards presentation was held on February 16, 2000, online courtesy of Reel Images Magazine. Two years later, the third annual Black Reel Awards held its first live presentation at a private dinner function at the Cada Vez in Washington, DC, with an audience of about 150 people. Twenty statuettes were awarded, honoring African American artists, directors and other participants in the filmmaking industry, for their works in 2001. The ceremony ran for 90 minutes.

In subsequent years, the Black Reel Awards have largely been presented in the nation's capital, with the exception of one year when the awards were moved to New York. The awards have been presented live several times: the fourth annual Black Reel Awards presentation was held at H2O on the Southwest waterfront in Washington, DC with an audience of about 200 people; the sixth annual Black Reel Awards presentation was held at the French Embassy with an audience of about 350 people; and the thirteenth annual Black Reel Awards presentation was held at the MIST Harlem with an audience of about 200 people.

Initially winners were announced online. Later, the live awards presentations would use a sealed envelope to reveal the name of each winner.

The Black Reel Awards benefit the Foundation for the Advancement of African-Americans in Film (FAAAF), a non-profit arts organization whose mission is to provide educational opportunities to future minority film executives. Through the FAAAF programs "Reel Kids", and "Producer's Institute", scholarships are awarded to minority junior high, high school and college graduate students pursuing careers in the movie and television industries.

In 2015, the foundation changed its name to the Foundation for the Augmentation of African-Americans in Film.

Institutions
The first Outstanding Actor award was given to Denzel Washington for his performance in The Hurricane. He subsequently received the same honor the next two years, for his performances in Remember the Titans and Training Day.

At the 3rd Annual Black Reel Awards ceremony, held on February 16, 2002, the Outstanding Foreign Film category was introduced.

The 6th Annual Black Reel Awards, held in 2005, presented the first Vanguard Award for entertainer of the year to Jamie Foxx for his performances in  Collateral, Redemption: The Stan Tookie Williams Story, and  Ray.

Each of the Black Reel Awards ceremonies has ended with the Black Reel Award for Outstanding Film.

Black Reel Awards statuette

Motion picture categories

Outstanding Film: since 2000
Outstanding Actor: since 2000
Outstanding Actress: since 2000
Outstanding Director: since 2000
Outstanding Supporting Actor: since 2000
Outstanding Supporting Actress: since 2000
Outstanding Screenplay, Adapted or Original: since 2000
Outstanding Ensemble: since 2006
Outstanding Documentary: since 2010
Outstanding Foreign Film: since 2012
Outstanding World Cinema Film: since 2017
Outstanding Original Score: since 2011
Outstanding Original Song: since 2001
Outstanding Voice Performance: since 2013

Independent & next generation categories

Outstanding Independent Film: since 2002
Outstanding Independent Documentary: since 2010
Outstanding Independent Short Film: since 2010
Outstanding Breakthrough Performance: since 2003
Outstanding Emerging Director: since 2017
Outstanding First Screenplay: since 2017

Professional categories
 Outstanding Cinematography : Since 2019
 Outstanding Costume Design: Since 2019
 Outstanding Production Design: Since 2019

Discontinued categories
 Outstanding Actor, Drama: 2005 only
 Outstanding Actress, Musical or Comedy: 2005 only
 Outstanding Supporting Actor, Drama: 2005 only
 Outstanding Supporting Actress, Musical or Comedy: 2005 only
 Outstanding Film, Drama: 2005 only
 Outstanding Film, Musical or Comedy: 2005 only
 Outstanding Film Poster: 2001 to 2002
 Outstanding Original Soundtrack: 2000 to 2009
 Outstanding Actor (Independent Film): 2002 to 2005
 Outstanding Actress (Independent Film): 2003 to 2005
 Outstanding Original Television Program: 2001 to 2005

In 2005, three categories, Outstanding Actor, Outstanding Actress, as well as Outstanding Film awards were split into two separate categories (Drama and Musical/Comedy). In addition, the Outstanding Original Television Program was discontinued in 2005 and later expanded and resurfaced in 2015 as the Outstanding Television Documentary or Special category.

Television categories

A television awards, known as the Black Reel Awards for Television was first presented on August 1, 2017. The awards honors performers, programs, directors and writers over 27 categories in drama, comedy, music, documentaries and TV Movie or Limited Series. The TV Movie or Limited Series categories, which previously were honored as part of the Black Reel Awards were moved to the television awards.

Special categories
The Special Black Reel Awards are voted on by special foundation committees, rather than by the voting academy membership as a whole. They are not always presented on a consistent annual basis.

Current special categories
 Vanguard Entertainer of the Year Award: since 2004
 Oscar Micheaux Filmmaker Distinction Award: since 2017
 Sidney Poitier Lifetime Achievement Award: since 2017
 Ruby Dee Humanitarian Award: since 2017

Discontinued special categories
 Black Reel Award Special Achievement Award: 2004 to 2006

Ceremonies

Film nominations
Below are the motion picture films with 10 or more nominations. The Harder They Fall holds the record for the most nominations with 20 while Black Panther holds the record for  most wins for a single film with 10 categorical wins. 12 Years a Slave, Selma, and Dolemite Is My Name are tied for second place with 8 wins apiece. BlacKkKlansman currently holds the record for most nominations without a single win (11). 

20 Nominations
 The Harder They Fall 6 wins

17 Nominations
 Black Panther 10 wins

15 Nominations
 One Night in Miami... 5 wins

14 nominations
 Black Panther: Wakanda Forever 5 wins
 For Colored Girls 3 wins
 If Beale Street Could Talk 4 wins
 Queen & Slim 4 wins
 The Woman King 6 wins

13 nominations
 Moonlight 7 wins
 Passing 3 wins

12 nominations
 Get Out 7 wins
 Judas and the Black Messiah 3 wins

 11 nominations
 BlacKkKlansman 0 wins
 Dreamgirls 6 wins
 Till 2 wins
 Us 4 wins

10 nominations
 Baby Boy 0 wins
 Cadillac Records 3 wins
 Dear White People 2 wins
 Dolemite Is My Name 8 wins
  Fences 2 wins
 The Inspection 4 wins
 Love & Basketball 6 wins
 Ma Rainey's Black Bottom 2 wins
 Precious 7 wins
 Ray 6 wins
 Selma 8 wins

Records

Film

Actors with multiple awards for motion picture performances
 D - indicates a winning role in drama categories (2005 ceremony)
 C/M - indicates a winning role in comedy or musical categories (2005 ceremony)
I - indicates a winning role in Independent categories

Notes

Actors with five or more nominations for motion picture performances

Television

Actors with multiple awards for television performances
 D - indicates a winning role in drama categories 
 C - indicates a winning role in comedy categories
M/LS - indicates a winning role in television movie, mini-series or limited series categories
 Years Italicized - Honored at Black Reel Awards Film honors (2000 - 2017)

Actors with five or more nominations for television performances

See also
Black Filmmakers Hall of Fame
Black Reel Awards for Television

References

External links
Official Website
The Foundation for the Augmentation of African-Americans in Film

 
American film awards
Awards established in 2000